Monosyntaxis radiifera is a moth of the family Erebidae. It was described by Karel Černý in 1995. It is found on Mindanao in the Philippines.

References

Lithosiina
Moths described in 1995